Bombs Away Dream Babies is an album by John Stewart that was released by RSO Records  in 1979. The album peaked at No. 10 on the Billboard album chart and yielded three Top 40 singles: "Gold" (No. 5), "Midnight Wind", and "Lost Her in the Sun". This was the bestselling album of Stewart's career.

Lindsey Buckingham and Stevie Nicks, both of Fleetwood Mac, appeared on the album. Nicks sang background vocals. Buckingham sang, played guitar, and co-produced.

Track listing
All compositions by John Stewart.
 "Gold" – 4:26
 "Lost Her in the Sun" – 3:51
 "Runaway Fool of Love" – 2:32
 "Somewhere Down the Line" – 2:52
 "Midnight Wind" – 4:30
 "Over the Hill" – 3:13
 "The Spinnin' of the World" – 1:42
 "Comin' Out of Nowhere" – 2:03
 "Heart of the Dream" – 3:21
 "Hand Your Heart to the Wind" – 3:55

Personnel
 John Stewart – vocals, guitar, kalimba
 Lindsey Buckingham – guitar, vocals
 Stevie Nicks – vocals
 Joey Harris – guitar, vocals
 Joey Carbone – keyboards
 Wayne Hunt – keyboards, vocals
 Bryan Garofalo – bass guitar, vocals
 David Jackson – bass guitar
 Chris Whelan – bass guitar, vocals
 Buffy Ford Stewart – vocals
 Mary Kay Place – vocals
 Croxey Adams – vocals
 Dave Guard – vocals
 Catherine Guard – vocals
 Christine DeLisle – vocals
 Deborah Tompkins – vocals
 Mary Torrey – vocals
 Russ Kunkel – drums
 Mike Botts – drums
 Rick Shlosser – drums
 Gary Weisberg – drums

Charts

References

External links
 John Stewart's Official Website

1979 albums
John Stewart (musician) albums
RSO Records albums